Valery Brudov (born November 27, 1976) in Pskov, Russia is a former professional boxer. He held the WBA interim world cruiserweight title from 2006 until 2007, and challenged twice for the undisputed version of that title in 2006 and 2010. He also challenged once for the interim WBO cruiserweight title in 2012.

Professional career
He turned pro in 1999 winning his first 30 contests. This garnered him a WBC regional title and winning a WBA eliminator. His first shot at a world title came against Virgil Hill for the vacant Regular title in 2006, after Jean-Marc Mormeck was promoted to Super Champion. Valery lost a lopsided decision to the veteran. Hill was inactive for the rest of the year and Brudov scored a TKO over Luis Andres Pineda in December to become the inaugural Interim Champion. That reign only last six months when he lost a split decision to Firat Arslan. He challenged Guillermo Jones for the full championship in 2010, but was stopped in eleven rounds.

Professional boxing record

See also
List of cruiserweight boxing champions

References

External links

1976 births
Living people
Cruiserweight boxers
World cruiserweight boxing champions
World Boxing Association champions
Russian male boxers
Sportspeople from Pskov Oblast